Pasto is a purported Barbacoan language that was spoken by indigenous people of Pasto, Colombia and Carchi Province, Ecuador.  It is now extinct.

ISO issue
Prior to its retirement, the ISO name of the ISO code [bpb] was Barbacoas, the name of an extinct people who gave their name to the Barbacoan language family of which Pasto is a member, as well as to the Colombian town of Barbacoas.  However, nothing is known of their language, one of several also known as Colima (Loukotka 1968: 247), and it can only be assumed to be part of the Barbacoan family (Campbell 2012: 78). Such unattested, long-extinct languages are not normally assigned ISO codes.  MultiTree conflates Barbacoas with neighboring Pasto, which is well-enough attested for classification and assignment of an ISO code.  This does not however mean that the retired ISO code [bpb] can be properly used for the Pasto language.

Glottolog distinguishes unclassifiable [past1243] 'Pasto' from unattested [barb1242] 'Barbacoas'.

References

Awan languages
Extinct languages of South America
Unattested languages of South America
Unclassified languages of South America